Steel Vengeance, formerly known as Mean Streak, is a steel roller coaster at Cedar Point in Sandusky, Ohio. The roller coaster, originally constructed by Dinn Corporation as a wooden roller coaster, was rebuilt by Rocky Mountain Construction (RMC) and opened to the public on May 5, 2018. It is a hybrid coaster, using RMC's steel I-Box track and a significant portion of Mean Streak's former support structure. Upon completion, Steel Vengeance set 10 world records, including those for the tallest, fastest, and longest hybrid roller coaster.

Mean Streak opened to the public on May 11, 1991, as the tallest wooden coaster in the world with the longest drop height. After more than 25 years of operation, Cedar Point closed Mean Streak on September 16, 2016, casting doubt and uncertainty regarding the ride's future. Over time, the park dropped subtle hints about a possible track conversion, which was officially confirmed in August 2017. It was marketed as the world's first hybrid hypercoaster – a wooden and steel roller coaster at least  in height – and reemerged as Steel Vengeance. A minor collision on opening day led to a temporary closure and later modifications from RMC.

History

Wooden roller coaster 
Cedar Point revealed in 1990 that a new roller coaster would be built for the 1991 season. It was officially named Mean Streak on October 24, 1990. Construction began two months earlier in late August 1990 with land preparation. It continued through the rest of the year and spring of the following year. Mean Streak opened with the park's seasonal debut on May 11, 1991, in the Frontiertown section of the park behind one of Cedar Point & Lake Erie Railroad's stations. The ride's media day press conference was held on May 22, 1991.

Mean Streak was one of eleven roller coasters designed and manufactured by Ohio-based Dinn Corporation before the company went out of business in 1992. It was a twister coaster model designed by Curtis D. Summers, and the ride cost $7.5 million to construct. In September 2010, a small  section caught fire, which was quickly contained by firefighters to a small portion of the ride.

Hybrid refurbishment 
On August 1, 2016, Cedar Point announced that Mean Streak would offer its last rides to the public on September 16, 2016. Park officials, however, declined to confirm that the ride was being torn down. Following its closure, unconfirmed rumors emerged that the roller coaster was being refurbished by Rocky Mountain Construction (RMC), a manufacturing company well known for its restoration work on existing wooden roller coasters.

Cedar Point began teasing the public on the ride's future with the release of an 18-second teaser video entitled "They're Coming" on April 1, 2017. Cedar Point showed video shots briefly panning several elements of the rumored conversion. Another similar video showing snippets of the new ride was released a few months later in June. Three more videos were released over the summer of 2017, with catchphrases "They're rollin' in like thunder", "There's a score to settle", and "They stake their claim." On August 16, 2017, Cedar Point held an official announcement for Steel Vengeance. It was also announced that a virtual recreation of the ride would be made available in the PC video game, Planet Coaster. 

Steel Vengeance opened to the public on May 5, 2018, but a minor collision between two trains forced Steel Vengeance to remain closed for most of its opening day. The coaster resumed operation with only a single train while RMC investigated the issue and made modifications. The ride was closed on certain weekday mornings to allow RMC to make repairs. The park temporarily removed the ride from its Fast Lane Plus lineup and considered timed boarding passes as a result of its limited capacity. Normal two-train operation resumed on June 1, 2018.

Following an incident on Twisted Timbers at Kings Dominion, where a phone hit a rider in the face during the ride, Cedar Point issued a temporary ban on cell phones when entering the ride's queue beginning in August 2018. The ban was lifted the following season after zipper pouches were installed on the trains to safely secure loose items. Metal detectors were installed in the queue, ensuring that all loose articles were placed in these pouches. The pouches were removed in 2020 following the COVID-19 pandemic, and the previous ban was reinstated.

Characteristics

It was constructed from more than 1.5 million board feet (4,000 m³) of treated southern yellow pine. In 1994, a trim brake was installed on the first drop reducing its overall speed in an attempt to prevent abnormal track wear and increase ride comfort. Over the years, Mean Streak had been re-tracked several times. Some re-tracking was completed by Martin & Vleminckx. Prior to the 2012 operating season, many sections of track after the first drop were replaced. This was the most significant work done on the ride since it opened. Also, in 2012, a portion of the queue was removed to make room for a new building. The building is located in the infield of Mean Streak and is used for the HalloWeekends haunted house, Eden Musee. It is also used for storage during the off-season and summer.

Philadelphia Toboggan Coasters (PTC) manufactured three trains for Mean Streak. Each train had seven cars with riders arranged two across in two rows for a total of 28 riders per train. During the 2011–2012 off-season, all three trains were sent to PTC's headquarters for maintenance and refurbishment.

Its three new trains are each based on a character from the themed backstory of the ride: Jackson "Blackjack" Chamberlain, Chess "Wild One" Watkins, and Wyatt "Digger" Dempsey."

Ride experience

Mean Streak
After leaving the station, the Mean Streak train passed through the storage tracks and made a 180-degree turn to the right, before ascending the  lift hill. While dropping, riders went through a set of trim brakes on the first drop. Riders then went through a  twisted turnaround followed by a small airtime hill, and then another twisted turnaround. The train maneuvered over the lift hill and dipped down to the right. After that, the train traveled through the ride's structure and down another hill, turning to the left into the mid-course brake run. The train then dipped down to the left into another airtime hill. Riders then went through several small airtime hills and turned through the ride's structure followed by the final brake run. One cycle of the ride lasted 3 minutes and 13 seconds, making it the former longest duration of any roller coaster at Cedar Point.

When Mean Streak opened in 1991, it was the tallest wooden roller coaster in the world and featured the longest drop. Upon closure in 2016, Mean Streak had the seventh tallest lift, the tenth fastest speed, the fourth longest track-length and the seventh longest drop.

Steel Vengeance

After leaving the station, the train makes a 180 degree right turn, passes over two small bunny hills, and begins its ascent up the  chain lift hill. After this drop, the train traverses a small airtime hill, followed by a climb into a larger airtime hill, which drops riders slightly to the right. Next, the train climbs up a  left outward banked hill, dips slightly right, and passes over another small airtime hill, which leads to the first inversion, a zero-g roll. After this, the train dips right, passes underneath the lift hill, and traverses an overbanked right turn, which leads into the second inversion, a half stall, that sees the train pass through the lift hill structure for a second time. Then, the train dips straight, passes over a small airtime hill, and climbs up a hill. The train then makes an upward left-hand turn, which leads to the mid-course brake run. Following this, the train makes another sharp left turn into a short, steep drop slightly to the left. Next, the train navigates an upward, slightly overbanked turn to the left, traverses another airtime hill, then upward into a slightly overbanked left turn. This is followed by a small drop into a high-speed overbanked left turn, which leads into the third inversion, a zero-g roll. Next is a double-up into another high-speed overbanked left turn, which leads into the fourth inversion, a final zero-g roll. Next, another overbanked left turn into an airtime hill, followed by four more airtime hills, which lead to the final brake run back into the station. One cycle of the ride lasts 2 minutes and 30 seconds.

World records
Steel Vengeance broke 10 world records when it opened, some of which have since been broken.

Past records:
 World's tallest hybrid
 World's fastest hybrid roller coaster at 
 World's steepest drop on a hybrid roller coaster at 90 degrees
 World's longest drop on a hybrid roller coaster at 
 Most inversions on a hybrid roller coaster at 4

Current records:
 World's longest hybrid roller coaster at 
 Fastest airtime hill on a hybrid roller coaster at 
 Most airtime on a hybrid roller coaster at 27.2 seconds
 Most airtime on any roller coaster at 27.2 seconds
 World's first "hyper-hybrid" roller coaster

Incidents 

 During opening day on May 5, 2018, Steel Vengeance was temporarily closed following a minor collision between two trains. As a train was reentering the station, it "lightly bumped" another parked train. Four riders were treated for minor injuries and later returned to the park.
 On July 21, 2018, a 17-year-old boy was arrested and charged with a misdemeanor for throwing a hot sauce packet at a moving train. Seven people were treated by the park's EMS after the packet exploded and hit them in the face and eyes.
 On August 10, 2018, a tire from the drive system located near the brake run became detached and landed near the queue. The ride was then evacuated and reopened later that same evening.

Reception
Writers from The Pantagraph stated that Mean Streak was "the best-kept-secret at Cedar Point," as it was located at the very back of the park. The ride was also featured on the Today show in 1992 in connection with the 100th anniversary of roller coasters.

Mean Streak had been ranked as one of the most popular wooden roller coasters in the world. Amusement Today magazine's Golden Ticket Awards ranked Mean Streak as one of the world's 50 best wooden roller coasters nine times from 1998 to 2012.

Steel Vengeance received the Golden Ticket Award for Best New Ride in 2018. It has also been ranked among the top 50 steel coasters every year since its reopening, except in 2020, when the Golden Ticket Awards were not held.

See also
 Twisted Timbers – a roller coaster at sister park Kings Dominion that underwent a similar conversion.

References

External links
 Steel Vengeance at Rocky Mountain Construction

Roller coasters in Ohio
Cedar Point
Hybrid roller coasters
Roller coasters operated by Cedar Fair
1991 establishments in Ohio
Best New Ride winners